Leach Airport  is a county-owned, public-use airport in Saguache County, Colorado, United States. It is located four nautical miles (5 mi, 7 km) northeast of the central business district of Center, Colorado, at County Road 53 & County Road C.

Facilities and aircraft 
Leach Airport covers an area of 66 acres (27 ha) at an elevation of 7,598 feet (2,316 m) above mean sea level. It has one runway designated 12/30 with an asphalt surface measuring 7,000 by 50 feet (2,134 x 15 m).

For the 12-month period ending September 3, 2009, the airport had 1,700 general aviation aircraft operations, an average of 141 per month. At that time there were 10 aircraft based at this airport: 90% single-engine and 10% ultralight.

Data

Navigation
VOR 113.9 (ALAMOSA) .... GPS no .... ILS no

Runway
Lights LIRL .... VGSI none .... App Lgts none .... Taxiway unk
RWY 12 has 110’ displaced threshold
RWY 30 has 1345’ displaced threshold
Agricultural operations May–September
60 ft. powerlines 200 ft. from RWY 30 end on both sides of centerline
Itinerant ops: 200
Local ops: 1,500

Communication
CTAF/UNICOM 122.8 .... Lights 122.8 and ? clicks

Contact information
Airport Manager: Peggy McIntosh

Services
TSNT Storage hangars and tiedowns
Fuel 100LL
Transportation: courtesy car
Other services: aerial spraying

References 

 2007-2008 Colorado Airport Directory, Colorado Division of Aeronautics, CDOT, 5126 Front Range Parkway, Watkins, Colorado, 80137

External links
 Leach Airport from Colorado DOT Airport Directory
 Aerial image as of September 1998 from USGS The National Map
 

Airports in Colorado
Buildings and structures in Saguache County, Colorado
Transportation in Saguache County, Colorado